Breadwinner typically refers to the breadwinner model, a system where one family member earns money to support the others.

Breadwinner or Breadwinners may also refer to:

Books
 The Bread-Winner (play), a 1930 play by William Somerset Maugham
 The Bread Winner, a 1990 novel by Arvella Whitmore
 The Breadwinner (novel), a 2000 children's book by Deborah Ellis
 The Bread-Winners, an 1883 novel by John Hay

Film, television and video games
 "Breadwinner" (Birds of a Feather), an episode of the British sitcom Birds of a Feather
 Breadwinners (TV series), a 2014 animated series from Nickelodeon
 The Breadwinner (film), an Irish-Canadian animated film
 Breadwinner, a Splicer model in the video games BioShock and BioShock 2

Music
 Breadwinner (band), an American math rock band
 Ovation Breadwinner, a solid-body electric guitar made by the Ovation Guitar Company
 The Breadwinner, album by Shannon Stephens
 "Breadwinner", 1965 tune by Kenny Burrell from the album Guitar Forms
"Breadwinner", a song by Kacey Musgraves from the 2021 album Star-Crossed (album)